Gresty railway station served the town of Crewe, Cheshire, England, from 1911 to 1918 on the Crewe and Shrewsbury Railway.

History
The station was opened on 2 January 1911 by the London & North Western Railway. It closed on 1 April 1918. The Railway Clearing House handbook showed it as a halt in their 1921 list of closures.

References

 

Disused railway stations in Cheshire
Former London and North Western Railway stations
Railway stations in Great Britain opened in 1911
Railway stations in Great Britain closed in 1918
1911 establishments in England
1918 disestablishments in England